This is a list of the England national football team results from 1930 to 1959.

1930s

1930

1931

1932

1933

1934

1935

1936

1937

1938

1939

1940s

1946

1947

1948

1949

1950s

1950

1951

1952

1953

1954

1955

1956

1957

1958

1959

References

1930s in England
1940s in England
1950s in England
1930-59